Nurbergen Nurlykhassym (Nūrbergen Nūrlyhasym; born 25 March 2000) is a Kazakh cyclist, who currently rides for UCI WorldTeam .

Major results
2017
 2nd Road race, National Junior Road Championships
 9th Overall Tour de DMZ
2018
 3rd Road race, National Junior Road Championships
2021
 1st  Road race, National Under-23 Road Championships
2022
 4th Road race, National Road Championships

References

External links

2000 births
Living people
Kazakhstani male cyclists
Sportspeople from Astana